Raymond Wilson may refer to:

 Raymond Wilson (physicist) (1928–2018), who developed the concept of active optics
 Raymond Wilson (figure skater) (1944–?), British Olympic figure skater

See also 
 Ray Wilson (disambiguation)